Copper(II) acetylacetonate is the coordination compound with the formula Cu(O2C5H7)2. It is the homoleptic acetylacetonate complex of copper(II). It is a water-soluble bright blue solid. According to X-ray crystallography, the Cu center is square planar. Single crystals of this compound exhibit the unusual property of being highly flexible, allowing the formation of knots. The flexibility is attributed to the nature of the intermolecular forces.

References

Acetylacetonate complexes
Copper complexes